Ancema is a butterfly genus in the family Lycaenidae. The species of this genus are found in the Indomalayan realm and the Palearctic realm (the north-western Himalayas to western China).

Species
Ancema blanka (de Nicéville, 1894)
Ancema ctesia (Hewitson, 1865)

References

Remelanini
Lycaenidae genera
Taxa named by John Nevill Eliot